Aris Servetalis (Greek: Άρης Σερβετάλης) is a Greek actor.

Life and career
He was nominated for the Hellenic Film Academy Award for Best Leading Actor for the film L. He has won one television award for the television series Eisai to Tairi mou.

Filmography

References

External links

Greek male actors
21st-century Greek male actors
1976 births
Living people
Male actors from Athens